The Au Chapelet at 33 metres event was part of the archery programme at the 1900 Summer Olympics. Qualification for the event was through the large open team events, with the top six individual archers competing in the individual competition. The identities of only the top three archers in the event are known.

Background

This was the only appearance of the men's Au Chapelet at 33 metres. A 50 metres version was also held in 1900.

Competition format

Little is known about the format of the competition.

Schedule

Results

References

External links
 International Olympic Committee medal winners database
 De Wael, Herman. Herman's Full Olympians: "Archery 1900". Accessed 17 January 2006.
 

Au Chapelet 33 metres